Agustín Lucas Fidalgo (born 29 January 1996) is an Argentine former professional footballer who played as a forward.

Career
Fidalgo played in the youth ranks of Tigre, prior to joining Colegiales in 2017. His professional debut arrived on 2 December in a Primera B Metropolitana defeat to San Telmo, as he replaced Agustin Goñi after sixty-eight minutes. He made five more sub appearances in the 2017–18 campaign, before being selected to start for the first time in April 2018 against Villa San Carlos. Fidalgo announced his retirement in January 2020.

Career statistics

References

External links

1996 births
Living people
Place of birth missing (living people)
Argentine footballers
Association football forwards
Primera B Metropolitana players
Club Atlético Colegiales (Argentina) players